Leon Demaj (born 24 May 1997) is a German-Kosovar footballer who plays as a forward for Fortuna Köln.

References

External links
 

1997 births
Living people
People from Emsland
German footballers
Kosovan footballers
German people of Kosovan descent
Association football forwards
BV Cloppenburg players
SV Meppen players
Sportfreunde Lotte players
SC Fortuna Köln players
Regionalliga players
3. Liga players
Footballers from Lower Saxony